The women's field hockey tournament at the 2012 Summer Olympics was the 9th edition of the field hockey event for women at the Summer Olympic Games. It was held over a thirteen-day period beginning on 29 July, and culminating with the medal finals on 10 August. All games were played at the Riverbank Arena within the Olympic Park in London, United Kingdom.

Defending champions the Netherlands won the gold medal for the third time after defeating Argentina 2–0 in the final. Great Britain won the bronze medal by defeating New Zealand 3–1.

Competition format
The twelve teams in the tournament were divided into two pools of six, with each team initially playing round-robin games within their pool. Following the completion of the round-robin, the top two teams from each pool advance to the semi-finals. All other teams play classification matches to determine the final tournament rankings. The two semi-final winners meet for the gold medal match, while the semi-final losers play in the bronze medal match.

Qualification
Each of the continental champions from five federations and host received an automatic berth. The European, Asian and Oceanian federations received one extra quota based upon the FIH World Rankings at the completion of the 2010 World Cup. In addition to the three teams qualifying through the Olympic Qualifying Tournaments, the following twelve teams, shown with final pre-tournament rankings, competed in this tournament.

 – South Africa won the African qualifier tournament but gave up their automatic berth on the premise that they should play a qualifier having deemed the African tournament as sub-standard. Eventually they won the Qualification Tournament 1. Instead, Argentina was invited as the highest ranked team not already qualified after the conclusion of the continental championships.

Umpires
The FIH announced the list of umpires on 3 January 2012:

Squads

Results
All times are British Summer Time (UTC+01:00)''

First round
Rules for classification: 1) points; 2) goal difference; 3) goals scored; 4) head-to-head result.

Pool A

Pool B

Fifth to twelfth place classification

Eleventh and twelfth place

Ninth and tenth place

Seventh and eighth place

Fifth and sixth place

Medal round

Semifinals

Bronze medal match

Gold medal match

Statistics

Final ranking

Goalscorers

References

External links
Official FIH website
Schedule 

 
2012
2012 in women's field hockey
International women's field hockey competitions hosted by England
hockey
Women's tournament